Secret Story 5 started on July 8 at 8:45 pm on TF1 and concluded on October 14, 2011, lasting 98 days. The winner of this season is Marie Garet.

Housemates

Anthony
He is 26 years old, from Narbonne in France. On Day 1, during the first gala, he was nominated with Elizabeth in the « crystal ball ». He won his place in the House of Secrets with 75% to enter, but after only one week, he was evicted on Day 7 with 10% to save. His secret was not discovered by the other housemates during the show. His secret is : « I am a marksman ».

Aurélie
She is 23 years old, from Belgium. She entered the House of Secrets on Day 1 with Geof, her boyfriend, but The Voice gave her a mission to protect her secret during the first gala : to pretend to be in couple with Geoffrey, Marie's boyfriend, until the end of the show. During the show, she broke up with Geof, and she had a short love affair with Rudy (because he was evicted on Week 3). On Week 6, during the gala, she won the power of nominations, and she decided to nominate Ayem, Juliette, Daniel and Simon. Her secret was discovered by Sabrina on Week 10. In Week 11, Juliette who had won the power of eviction, eliminated Aurélie. But, in reality, she sent her in the Secret Room without knowing it (only Marie and Geoffrey know this) and Aurélie became the master of nominations this week. She decided during the gala to nominate Juliette, Sabrina and Zelko. In Week 13, Marie solved the Secret of the House and wion a place in the final but she gave this place to Aurélie after a dilemma. She finished in third place in the final with 9,2%. Her secret is : « We are in couple », sharing with Geof.

Ayem
Ayem came to fame when she was 22 years old. She is from Lyon, France. She joined the "House of Secrets" on Day 1 and had to fake being in a relationship with another contestant she had never met before. At first, she didn't even know which contestant she was supposed to pair with. On Week 1, she was able to figure out who her partner was, and both he, named Daniel, and she started acting accordingly. She was nominated twice by the two "Masters of the Underground", Zelko and Zarko. Although they nominated her on Week 1 and 2, Ayem was saved by the audience with 33% and 45% of the votes, respectively. On Week 5, she was nominated by Juliette, who was in the Secret Room. However, she was saved by the audience again with 41% of the votes. On Week 7, her secret was discovered by Zelko, but Daniel and she pursued their relationship. After the last gala, she was nominated by Aurélie, who had won the power of nominations. She was saved by the audience once again with 18.7% of the votes, but Daniel, who had become her boyfriend, was sent home. On Week 8, she was nominated because she was in the Nomination House but was saved by the audience with 19.76% of the votes. On Week 10, she was eventually eliminated instead of Zelko. Her (and Daniel's) secret was : We are a fake couple.

Daniel
He is 21 years. He enters the house on Day 1. His secret is to be a fake couple with Ayem.

In January 2012 he participated in Grande Fratello (season 12) (Day 78-92, ejected by Big Brother).

Elizabeth
Elizabeth is 20. Her secret is that she is gifted. She entered on the Cristal Ball and she was nominated with Anthony. She lost her place in the House with 25%. She was evicted on Day 1.

Geof
He is 26, from Brussels in Belgium. He is in a relationship with Aurélie, but is pretending to be married to Marie to protect the secret.

Geoffrey
He is 23, from Montpellier, France. He is married to Marie, although to protect this secret he is pretending to be in a relationship with Aurélie, who is actually in a relationship with Geof.

Jonathan
He is 26, and he is from Nice. His secret is that he is a Freemason.

Julie
She is 23. She was evicted on Day 15.

Juliette
She is 20 years. She enters the house on Day 1. She was evicted on Day 85.

Marie
Marie was 26 years old when she joined the "House of Secrets". She is from Montpellier, France. Her secret was that she was in a relationship with Geoffrey. To protect her secret, she had to pretend to be in a relationship with another contestant, Geof, himself involved with another competitor, Aurélie. Vice versa, Aurélie had to pretend to be in relationship with Geoffrey. Even though Marie went through a lot on the show, she triumphed and was proclaimed the winner of Secret Story's season 5. She was among the final four contestants along with Zelko, Aurélie and Geoffrey.

Marie-Josée
She is 39. Her secret is that she was a nun. She walked Day 9 because she missed her son.

Morgan
He is 21. His secret is to be a cheerleader. He lives in Toulouse (France).

Morgane « Mogo »
Her secret is that her father is called Brigitte. She was evicted on Day 92.

Rudy
He's 21. He discovers half of Sabrina's secret on Day 20. He has a relation with Aurélie.

Sabrina

She is 30. Her secret is that she lives with someone else's lungs due to a disease that nearly took her life.

Simon
He entered the house on Day 1.
He is 20 years old.

Zarko
He is 23 years and Zelko is his twin from Serbia. He enters the house on Day 0, before the other housemates with his brother, on the "Underground Labyrinth".

Zelko
He is 23 years and Zarko is his twin from Serbia. He enters the house on Day 0, before the other housemates with his brother, on the "Underground Labyrinth".

Secrets

Nominations
Nominations follow a different formula than is typical of the Big Brother franchise. Each week the housemates alternate nominations: male housemates nominate female housemates one week, and female housemates nominate male housemates the following week. In some weeks housemates are only permitted to nominate one housemate, rather than the typical two; this, usually occurs when at least one housemate has been already nominated by La Voix (Big Brother). Also, during some weeks, twist occur which affect the nomination procedure.

 --> Nominated forever.   --> In Secret Room.

: Anthony and Elizabeth are nominated to enter the House. Viewers have to choose who deserves to enter the house with his/her secret.

: Zarko and Zelko could nominate one housemate forever until the eviction of the housemate that they chose.

: In week one of nominations, only female housemates could nominate.

: Ayem does not discover who is responsible for her nomination forever. She is definitely nominated until her eviction.

: In week two of nominations, only male housemates could nominate.

: In week three of nominations, only female housemates could nominate.

: To protect his secret and not lose money, Rudy accepts giving Aurélie immunity.

: To protect his secret, Morgan accepts nominating Geoffrey.

: To protect their secrets, Zarko, Zelko and Rudy accept nominating Morgan.

: In week four of nominations, only female housemates could nominate. They have to nominate only one male housemate.

: Juliette is in the Secret Room, and she has the power to be the only housemate to nominate two female housemates. Nobody knows that Juliette is in the Secret Room. They think she has been evicted by the Red Phone.

: After an easy dilemma, Zarko deletes his nomination forever.

: La Voix has announced that two housemates will be evicted on Day 29. Actually, only one housemate (Morgan). All housemates think that Morgan and Geoffrey are evicted. But Geoffrey is in the Secret Room with Juliette, and he can help her choose the two female housemates that Juliette must nominate on Tuesday (Day 33).

: In week six of nominations, only female housemates could nominate.

: In week seven of nominations, Aurelie is the only one responsible for nominations.

: In week eight, the contestants are separated into two Houses: The Immune House and The Nomination House. But transfers of contestants take place during the week. Finally, Juliette, Simon, Ayem and Zelko are nominated because they are in the Nomination House at the end of this transfer.

: In week nine, Juliette and Ayem are normally nominated. But Juliette is immune because she solved an enigma of the corridor of 4 elements. Marie is the third girl who topped the appointment, she replaces Juliette. But Marie has a Joker card, she nominates Zelko be eliminated in the place of Ayem.

: Geof has revealed Geoffrey and Marie's secret, he cheated and asked Zelko to buzz Geoffrey and Marie's secret. Geof and Zelko are nominated by La Voix.

: In week eleven, Juliette has the power of elimination and eliminates Aurélie. But, in reality, Aurélie is in the Secret Room (only Marie and Geoffrey know this) and she becomes the master of nominations this week. She decided on Friday to nominate Juliette, Sabrina and Zelko.

: In week thirteen, Marie solves the secret of the House and wins a place in the final but she gives this place to Aurélie after a dilemma.

Nominations : Results

Prime-Time Ratings 
Like every year the first prime-time is at 08.45pm.

References

External links
  Official website for Secret Story
 Big brother news site

2011 French television seasons
05